Sandra Gomis (born 21 November 1983 in Saint Nazaire, France) is a French track and field athlete who specialises in the 100 metres hurdles.

International competitions

National Championships 
 French Athletic Championships of 100m hurdles
 2009 (13.15s)
 2011 (12.93s) (+1,0 m/s)
 French Indoor Athletic Championships of 60m hurdles
 Vice-champion of France of 60m hurdles in 2011: 8.00s
 Vice-champion of France of 60m hurdles in 2012 with 8.10s

References

1983 births
Living people
French female hurdlers
Athletes (track and field) at the 2016 Summer Olympics
Olympic athletes of France
Mediterranean Games silver medalists for France
Mediterranean Games medalists in athletics
Athletes (track and field) at the 2009 Mediterranean Games
Sportspeople from Saint-Nazaire
21st-century French women